Swamimalai Bronze Icons refers to bronze idols and statues manufactured in Swamimalai, Tamil Nadu. It has been recognized as a Geographical indication by the Government of India in 2008–09.

History
During the reign of Chola empire, Raja Raja I commissioned a group of sculptors for the construction of the Brihadeeswarar Temple at Thanjavur. The sculptors helped cast statues for Airavatesvara Temple and later settled at Swamimalai.

Production
The production is closely controlled and limited in number to maintain quality. The statues made mainly include that of Hindu deities. Other icons of animals, figures of males and females are also cast based on requirements. The statues are made using the technique of wax casting and the cast can be of two types - solid and hollow cast.

Solid wax casts are traditionally used and the model of the required image is cast as a mould filled with wax, made by mixing pure bee wax with resin from the Platanus orientalis and ground nut oil in the ratio 4:4:1. The wax pattern is coated with three layers of clay known as investment with each layer made from different clay. The first coat about 3 mm thick is made when fine loam or alluvial soil collected from the Kaveri river bed finely ground with charred paddy husk mixed with cow dung, the second layer by mixing clay from paddy fields with sand and the third layer being a mix of coarse sand with clay. For large statues, the clay coating is reinforced using metal rods.

The mould is heated to remove the wax and the molten metal is poured into the mould. During historic times, the molten metal was an alloy of five metals: gold, silver, copper, zinc and lead, known as Panchaloha. As gold and silver are expensive, they are replaced by tin and iron. Once the metal cools, the mould is broken and the metal statue is polished further to produce the icon.

Measurements
The sculptor takes measurements using units of measurement laid down in Shilpa Shastras for icon making. The basic unit of measurement is tala, which is the distance between the hairline and the end of the lower jaw. The tala is divided into 12 equal parts called angula (roughly equivalent to the breadth of a finger) which is further divided into eight yava (the size of a barley grain) and so on until the smallest unit, a paramu (smaller than the end of a single hair). The measurements are noted using a narrow ribbon of coconut tree leaf cut to the icon length requirement and folded at different lengths in proportion to the length of various parts of the icon.

Artisans
About 1200 people in Swamimalai are involved in metal sculpting. The artisans are known as sthapathis, who are traditionally from the Vishwakarma community and have practiced metal casting for several generations.

Export
The bronze icons made in Swamimalai are in high demand and are exported to number of countries including United States, United Kingdom, Canada, Australia, South Africa, Switzerland, Malaysia and Thailand. About 60 percent of the total production is exported and the statues are installed in Hindu temples built in various countries by NRIs.

Geographical Indication
In 2008, the Government of Tamil Nadu applied for Geographical Indication for Swamimalai Bronze Icons. The Government of India recognized it as a Geographical indication officially since the year 2008-09.

See also
Bidriware
Mysore Rosewood Inlay
Mysore Sandal Soap

References

Bronze sculptures in India
Indian metalwork
Geographical indications in Tamil Nadu
Economy of Tamil Nadu
Cult images